The Sri Lanka Army 50th Anniversary Medal (Sinhala: ශ්‍රී ලංකා යුද්ධ හමුදා 50වන සංවත්සර පදක්කම Śrī Laṃkā yuddha hamudā panasvana sangwathsara padakkama) was presented to all ranks of the regular and volunteer servicepersons of the Sri Lanka Army provided they have completed a minimum of ten years in service by October 8, 1999, the year of the 50th anniversary of the Ceylon Army.

External links
Sri Lanka Army
Ministry of Defence : Sri Lanka

References

Military awards and decorations of Sri Lanka
Awards established in 1999
1999 establishments in Sri Lanka